Chaldean Catholics, also known as Chaldeans (Kaldāyē), Chaldo-Assyrians or Assyro-Chaldeans, are modern Assyrian adherents of the Chaldean Catholic Church, which originates from the historic Church of the East.

Other Christian denominations present in Iraq include the Assyrian Church of the East and the Ancient Church of the East (both of which also are now composed of Assyrians and originate from the historic Church of the East and are now significantly less numerous than the Chaldean Catholic Church), the Syriac Orthodox Church and the Syriac Catholic Church.

The Chaldean Catholic community was formed in Upper Mesopotamia in the 16th and 17th centuries, arising from groups of the Church of the East who, after the schism of 1552, entered communion with the Holy See (the Catholic Church). Chaldean Catholics, indigenous to the regions of northern Iraq, southeastern Turkey, northeastern Syria and northwestern Iran, have since migrated to Western countries including the United States, Canada, Mexico, Australia, Sweden and Germany. Many of them also live in Lebanon, Egypt, Palestine, Israel, Jordan, Iran, Turkey, and Georgia. The most recent reasons for migration are religious persecution, ethnic persecution, poor economic conditions during the sanctions against Iraq, and poor security conditions after the 2003 invasion of Iraq.

Identity and names 
Followers of the Chaldean Catholic Church often identify and are identified as "Chaldean" but, like adherents of the Syriac Orthodox Church, Syriac Catholic Church, Assyrian Church of the East and Ancient Church of the East who also live in or originate from Upper Mesopotamia, they call themselves Suraye in their own language. When their community entered communion with Rome, the Catholic Church called them, as before, Chaldeans, prohibiting the use for them of the description "Nestorians", reserving the latter term for followers of the Church of the East who were not in communion. The name "Chaldean" applied to both branches, and is still in use for the Chaldean Syrian Church in India, which is in union with the Assyrian Church of the East.

In 1908, before the Assyrian genocide, the dissolution of the Ottoman Empire and the creation of new states in the Middle East such as Iraq, an article in the Catholic Encyclopedia states: “Strictly, the name of Chaldeans is no longer correct; in Chaldea proper, apart from Baghdad, there are now very few adherents of this rite, most of the Chaldean population being found in the cities of Kirkuk, Erbil, and Mosul, in the heart of the Tigris valley, in the valley of the Zab, and in the mountains of Kurdistan. It is in the former ecclesiastical province of Ator (Assyria) that are now found the most flourishing of the Catholic Chaldean communities. The native population accepts the name of Atoraya-Kaldaya (Assyro-Chaldeans), while in the neo-Syriac vernacular Christians generally are known as Syrians." The consequent upheaval produced both an exodus, in particular but not only from what is now Turkey, to other countries and, within Iraq, a mainly urbanized Chaldean Church.

Kurdish organizations often wrongfully refer to local Christians as Kurdish Christians. Some Assyrians in northern Iraq supported Kurdish military and political activities in order to "advance the cause of Assyrian nationalism" and "sought to control the discourse on nomenclature among the Christian communities utilising 'Assyrian' as a suitable title for all Christians so that the supposed link to the Assyrian people of the ancient world could be maintained and give credence to their agitation for an independent state". The Assyrian Democratic Movement proposed to refer to the Christian population as "Chaldo-Assyrian", a political appellation from which the Chaldean Catholic Church soon withdrew support.

Raphael I Bidawid, patriarch of the Chaldean Catholic Church from 1989 to 2003 was quoted, after his death, in issue 55/3 (Fall 2003) of the Assyrian Star, as having said:
 "I personally think that these different names serve to add confusion. The original name of our Church was the ‘Church of the East’ … When a portion of the Church of the East became Catholic in the 17th Century, the name given was ‘Chaldean’ based on the Magi kings who were believed by some to have come from what once had been the land of the Chaldean, to Bethlehem. The name ‘Chaldean’ does not represent an ethnicity, just a church… We have to separate what is ethnicity and what is religion… I myself, my sect is Chaldean, but ethnically, I am Assyrian."

Before becoming Chaldean patriarch, he was quoted in the September–October 1974 issue of the Assyrian Star as saying in an interview:
 "Before I became a priest I was an Assyrian, before I became a bishop I was an Assyrian, I am an Assyrian today, tomorrow, forever, and I am proud of it."

In 2017, the Chaldean Catholic Church issued an official statement of its Synod of Bishops, the body that is exclusively competent to make laws for the entire church and that is its tribunal, It said it sets store on the distinct Chaldean identity, which is recognized in the Constitution of Iraq, and declared:
 "As a genuine Chaldean people, we officially reject the labels that distort our Chaldean identity, such as the composite name “Chaldean Syriac Assyrian” used in the Kurdistan Region, contrary to the name established in the Iraqi constitution. We call upon our daughters and sons to reject these labels, to adhere to their Chaldean identity without fanaticism, and to respect the other names such as ‘Assyrians’, ‘Syriacs’, and ‘Arameans’. We call upon the authorities in the region to respect them, and we encourage our Chaldeans to cooperate with everyone for the common good and not to split into unidentified groups or follow illusory projects that harm Christians. We also encourage them to engage in public affairs and in the political process as genuine partners of this blessed land, and to play their role alongside their fellow citizens in building a modern and strong civil country that befits their country’s civilization and glory, a country that respects the rights and equality of all. We also express our support for the Chaldean League which seeks to establish links between the Chaldeans around the world."

During Horatio Southgate's travels through Mesopotamia, he encountered indigenous Christians and stated that Chaldeans consider themselves to be descended from Assyrians, but he also recorded that the same Chaldeans hold that Jacobites are descended from Syrians: "Those of them who profess to have any idea concerning their origin, say, that they are descended from the Assyrians, and the Jacobites from the Syrians, whose chief city was Damascus.” Those ancient Syrians of Damascus, in terms of Biblical tradition, were ancient Arameans of Aram-Damascus.

A letter from November 14, 1838 writes: “The so-called “Chaldeans" of Mesopotamia received that title, as you know, from the pope, on their becoming Catholics.”

In 1843, The North American Review stated: “These, however, for the most part, more than a century ago gave in their adhesion to the Pope of Rome; and their patriarch, still residing at el-Kôsh, acknowledges his supremacy. The Pope bestowed upon them, in return, the venerable, but unmeaning, title of Chaldeans, which they now claim; although they were and are truly nothing more than papal Nestorians, or Nestorian Catholics.” 

In 1875, Henry John Van-Lennep (d. 1889), who was working as an American missionary among Eastern Christians in the Ottoman Near East, stated that: "The name Aramean is generally applied to all the inhabitants of the country which extends from the eastern boundary of Assyria to the Mediterranean, exclusive of Asia Minor proper and Palestine.” According to Van-Lennep, the Arameans are divided in two branches, eastern ("the Eastern Arameans, or Assyrians, now called Chaldeans"), and western ("the Western Arameans, or modern Syriacs).”

Henry John Van-Lennep also stated: “At the schism on account of Nestorius, the Assyrians, under the generic name of the Chaldean Church, mostly separated from the Orthodox Greeks, and, being under the rule of the Persians, were protected against persecution.”

In 1881, archeologist and author Hormuzd Rassam stated: “The inhabitants of Assyria consist now of mixed races, Arabs, Turkomans, Koords, Yezeedees, Jews, and Christians called Chaldeans and Syrians. The last two-named denominations doubtless belong to one nationality, the Assyrian, and they were only distinguished by these two names when they separated consequent upon the theological dispute of the age, namely, Monophisites or Jacobites, and Nestorians.”

In 1920, Herbert Henry Austin stated: “It may not be out of place, therefore, to point out that there were exceedingly few Roman Catholic Assyrians or “Chaldeans" as they are generally termed when they embrace Rome, amongst the refugees at Baqubah. The very large majority of the Roman Catholic Assyrians in the Mosul vilayet did not join the mountaineers and fight against the Turks and in consequence were permitted by the Turks to continue to dwell practically unmolested in their homes about Mosul."

Population

There were 640,828 adherents of the Chaldean Catholic Church worldwide according to the 2016 Annuario Pontificio.

Iraq

There are currently an estimated 250,000 Christians remaining in Iraq of whom 80% are adherents of the Chaldean Catholic Church.
In northern Iraq, the Chaldean Catholic community inhabits Alqosh, Ankawa, Araden, Baqofah, Batnaya, Karamlesh, Mangesh, Shaqlawa, Tesqopa, Tel Keppe, and Zakho. The Chaldean Catholic Church has its headquarter in the Cathedral of Mary Mother of Sorrows in Baghdad which is also the resident of their patriarch Louis Raphaël I Sako.

Chaldeans are also mentioned in Article 125 of the Iraqi constitution as a nationality distinct from the Turkomen and the Assyrians in which this Constitution guarantees the administrative, political, cultural and educational rights for the various nationalities of Iraq.

Syria, Turkey and Iran

In Syria, Chaldean Catholics number 10,000; in Turkey, 48,594; and in Iran, 3,390.

Diaspora

In Southeast Michigan there is a Chaldean Catholic community numbering over 113,000 people. This is the largest Chaldean Catholic diaspora community outside Iraq. Most members are Neo-Aramaic- or Arabic-speaking.

A small number of Chaldean Catholic families live in Israel and the Palestinian territories. Occasionally the Chaldean Patriarchate has tried to administer them through the Chaldean street residence of a currently vacant Chaldean Patriarchal Exarch in Jerusalem.

History and origin

The Chaldean community originates from groups of adherents of the Church of the East that entered into communion with the Roman Catholic Church in the 16th and 17th centuries. The community emerged after the schism of 1552. These "Nestorian" Uniates received the name "Chaldeans" from the Roman Curia, which had given the ancient name Chaldaei to them.

The term Chaldean, used in reference to members of the Chaldean Catholic Church, arose in the mid-15th century. Previously, it was used in reference to the Church of the East, which, because it rejected the Council of Ephesus (431), was called Nestorian.

Neither before nor after the 15th century did the term "Chaldean" indicate a supposed ethnic connection of the Church of the East with ancient south Babylonian Chaldea and its inhabitants, which emerged during the 9th century BC after Chaldean tribes migrated from the Levant region of Urfa in Upper Mesopotamia to southeast Mesopotamia, and disappeared from history during the 6th century BC: it referred instead to the use by Christians of that church of the Syriac language, a form of the biblical Aramaic language, which was then and indeed until the 19th century generally called Chaldean. The Chaldean Catholics originated from ancient communities living in and indigenous to the northern Iraq/Mesopotamia, once known as Assyria (from the 25th century BC until the 7th century AD). Chaldean Catholics largely bear the same family and personal names, share the same genetic profile, hail from the same villages, towns and cities in northern Iraq, southeastern Turkey, northeastern Syria and northwestern Iran, as their neighbours of other religious denominations. The Chaldean Neo-Aramaic, Assyrian Neo-Aramaic and Surayt/Turoyo languages do not run parallel to the often associated religious denominations (Chaldean Catholic Church, Assyrian Church of the East, Syriac Orthodox Church).

The term "Chaldean" continued to apply to all who were of the Church of the East tradition, whether they were or were not in communion with Rome. Throughout the 19th century it continued to be used of East Syriac Christians, whether "Nestorian" or Catholic, and this usage continued into the 20th century. In 1852 George Percy Badger distinguished those whom he called Chaldeans from those whom he called Nestorians, but by religion alone, never by language, race or nationality.

20th century

According to a 1950 CIA report on Iraq, Chaldeans numbered 98,000 and were the largest Christian minority.

A 1950 CIA report on Iraq estimated 98,000 Chaldean Catholics, 30,000 Nestorians, 25,000 Syriac Catholics and 12,000 Syriac Orthodox Christians.

21st century

In 2019, the United States Commission on International Religious Freedom, reported that, according to the Iraqi Christian Foundation, an agency of the Chaldean Catholic Church, approximately 80% of Iraqi Christians were of that Church. In its own 2018 Report on Religious Freedom, the U.S. Department of State put the Chaldean Catholics at approximately 67% of the Christians in Iraq. The 2019 Country Guidance on Iraq of the European Asylum Support Office gave the same information as the U.S. Department of State. According to scholar James Minahan, around 45% of the Assyrian people belong to the Chaldean Catholic Church.

According to estimates by the Catholic Church, in Chaldean dioceses in Iraq there were 150,000 Catholics in the Archdiocese of Baghdad (2015), 30,000 in the Archeparchy of Arbil (2012), 22,300 in the Diocese of Alqosh (2012), 18,800 in the Diocese of Amadiyah and Zakho (2015), 14,100 in the Archeparchy of Mosul (2013), 7,831 in the Archdiocese of Kirkuk (2013), 1,372 in Diocese of Aqrā (2012), 800 in Archeparchy of Basra (2015),

Condition of the Chaldean Catholic Church

The 1896 census of the Chaldean Catholics counted 233 parishes and 177 churches or chapels, mainly in northern Iraq and southeastern Turkey. The Chaldean Catholic clergy numbered 248 priests; they were assisted by the monks of the Congregation of St. Hormizd, who numbered about one hundred. There were about 52 Assyrian Chaldean schools (not counting those conducted by Latin nuns and missionaries). At Mosul there was a patriarchal seminary, distinct from the Chaldean seminary directed by the Dominicans. The total number of Assyrian Chaldean Christians as by 2010 was 490,371, 78,000 of whom are in the Diocese of Mosul.

The current patriarch considers Baghdad as the principal city of his see. His former title of "Patriarch of Babylon" results from the identification of Baghdad with ancient Babylon (however Baghdad is 55 miles north of the ancient city of Babylon and corresponds to northern Babylonia). However, the Chaldean patriarch resides habitually at Mosul in the north, and reserves for himself the direct administration of this diocese and that of Baghdad.

There are five archbishops (resident respectively at Basra, Diyarbakır, Kirkuk, Salmas and Urmia) and seven bishops. Eight patriarchal vicars govern the small Assyrian Chaldean communities dispersed throughout Turkey and Iran. The Chaldean clergy, especially the monks of Rabban Hormizd Monastery, have established some missionary stations in the mountain districts dominated by the Assyrian Church of the East. Three dioceses are in Iran, the others in Turkey.

The liturgical language of the Chaldean Catholic Church is Syriac and the liturgy of the Chaldean Church is written in the Syriac alphabet. The literary revival in the early 20th century was mostly due to the Lazarist Pere Bedjan, an ethnic Assyrian Chaldean Catholic from northwestern Iran. He popularized the ancient chronicles, the lives of Assyrian saints and martyrs, and even works of the ancient Assyrian doctors among Assyrians of all denominations, including Chaldean Catholics, Syriac Orthodox, Assyrian Church of the East and Assyrian Protestants.

In 2016, Chaldean Catholics numbered approximately 400,000 of Iraq's Christians, with smaller numbers found among Christian communities of northeastern Syria, southeastern Turkey, northwestern Iran, Lebanon, Jordan, Israel, Georgia and Armenia. In 2008, Catholics were still about 550,000, forming the majority of Iraq's estimated 700,000 Christians, but all Iraqi Christians were under attack by Sunni extremists in the wake of the 2003 Gulf War invasion and it was estimated that 60,000 Christians had by then fled the country. Perhaps the best known Iraqi Chaldean Catholic was Deputy Prime Minister (1979–2003) and Foreign Minister (1983–1991) Tariq Aziz.

By 2012, hundreds of thousands of Christians of all denominations left Iraq after the ousting of Saddam Hussein. At least 20,000 of them fled through Lebanon to seek resettlement in Europe and the United States. In March 2008, the Chaldean Catholic Archbishop of Mosul Paulos Faraj Rahho was kidnapped, and found dead two weeks later. Pope Benedict XVI condemned his death. Sunni and Shia leaders also expressed their condemnation. As political changes sweep through many Arab nations, the ethnic Assyrian minorities throughout the Middle East have expressed concern about the developments and their future in the region.

Organizations
Parties
Chaldean Democratic Party, Chaldean Catholic democratic party in Iraq
Chaldean Syriac Assyrian Popular Council, joint Chaldean-Syriac-Assyrian democratic party in Iraq
Assyrian Democratic Movement, Assyrian political party in Iraq
Sons of Mesopotamia, Assyrian political party in Iraq

Militias
Qaraqosh Protection Committee
Nineveh Plain Protection Units
Babylon Movement
Dwekh Nawsha

Notable people

Mark Arabo – Chaldean-American spokesman for Christians in Iraq
Tariq Aziz
Issa Benyamin – calligrapher
Paul Bedjan
Toma Audo – bishop, writer
Hormuzd Rassam – Assyriologist, and first-known Middle Eastern archaeologist
Maria Theresa Asmar
Anna Eshoo
Hala Y. Jarbou
Rebin Sulaka – Chaldean Swedish footballer – Iraq International
Justin Meram
Randa Markos
Mona Hanna-Attisha
Basim Bello – Mayor of Tel Keppe, Iraq

See also
Assyrian Church of the East
Ancient Church of the East
Syriac Christianity
Terms for Syriac Christians
East Syriac Rite

References

Sources

Further reading

Oussani, G., 1901. "The modern Chaldeans and Nestorians, and the study of Syriac among them". Journal of the American Oriental Society, 22, pp. 79–96.
Hanoosh, Y.S., 2008. The politics of minority Chaldeans between Iraq and America. University of Michigan.

Alichoran, J., 1994. "Assyro-Chaldeans in the 20th Century: From Genocide to Diaspora". Journal of the Assyrian Academic Society, 8, pp. 45–79.

External links

The Chaldean Catholic Church
Iraq: Chaldean Christians UNHCR
Chaldean Christians in the Catholic Encyclopedia (1908)

 
Christianity in Iraq
Catholicism in Iraq
Iraqi Catholics
Christian denominations in Iraq
History of Eastern Catholicism
Ethnoreligious groups